Zarif Zakirovich Baiguskarov (born June 30, 1967, Kadyrovo, Kugarchinsky District, Republic of Bashkortostan) is a Russian political figure, deputy of the 7th and 8th State Duma convocations.

In 1998 he was appointed as a judge of the Ufa District Court. From 2001 to 2004, he was the chief bailiff of the republic.

Since September 2021, he has served as a deputy of the 8th State Duma. He ran with the United Russia to represent Bashkortostan. In the Duma, he was allocated to the Committee on Ecology, Natural Resources and Environmental Protection.

References

1967 births
Living people
People from Kugarchinsky District
United Russia politicians
21st-century Russian politicians
Eighth convocation members of the State Duma (Russian Federation)
Russian individuals subject to European Union sanctions